"Heart of Gold" is a song by Canadian singer-songwriter Neil Young. From his fourth album Harvest, it is Young's only U.S. No. 1 single. In Canada, it reached No. 1 on the RPM national singles chart for the first time on April 8, 1972, on which date Young held the top spot on both the singles and albums charts. Billboard ranked it as the No. 17 song for 1972. In 2004, Rolling Stone ranked it No. 297 on their list of the 500 greatest songs of all time, No. 303 in an updated 2010 list, and No. 259 in 2021.

Description
The song, which features backup vocals by James Taylor and Linda Ronstadt, is one of a series of soft acoustic pieces which were written partly as a result of a back injury. Unable to stand for long periods of time, Young could not play his electric guitar and so returned to his acoustic guitar, which he could play sitting down. He also played his harmonica during the three instrumental portions, including the introduction to the song.

"Heart of Gold" was recorded during the initial sessions for Harvest on February 6–8, 1971, at Quadrafonic Sound Studios in Nashville, Tennessee. Ronstadt (who herself would later cover Young's song "Love Is a Rose") and Taylor were in Nashville at the time for an appearance on Johnny Cash's television program, and the album's producer Elliot Mazer arranged for them to sing backup for Young in the studio.

Young played this song in 1971 solo shows before recording it. At a January 19 concert (preserved on Live at Massey Hall 1971, released in 2007) he played it on piano, starting with "A Man Needs a Maid" and then segueing into this song. By the time of Harvest, he had separated the two songs and played "Heart of Gold" on guitar and harmonica.

Young wrote in the liner notes of his 1977 compilation album Decade: "This song put me in the middle of the road. Traveling there soon became a bore so I headed for the ditch. A rougher ride but I saw more interesting people there." This statement was in response to the mainstream popularity that he gained as a result of the number-one status of "Heart of Gold".

Young has stated that this song, as well as "Harvest" and "Out on the Weekend" from the same album, were inspired by his then blossoming love for actress Carrie Snodgress.

In 1985, Bob Dylan said he disliked hearing the song, despite always liking Young:
The only time it bothered me that someone sounded like me was when I was living in Phoenix, Arizona, in about '72 and the big song at the time was "Heart of Gold". I used to hate it when it came on the radio. I always liked Neil Young, but it bothered me every time I listened to "Heart of Gold." I think it was up at number one for a long time, and I'd say, "Shit, that's me. If it sounds like me, it should as well be me."

Notable covers
 Boney M covered the song to widespread acclaim on the album Nightflight to Venus, released in 1978
 A cover by Willie Nelson peaked at No. 44 on the Billboard Hot Country Singles chart in 1987
 Roxette covered the song on their MTV Unplugged in 1993
 Bettye LaVette covered the song on her compilation album Souvenirs, released in 2000
 Black Label Society included a cover of the song on their 2-disc live album Alcohol Fueled Brewtality Live!! +5, released in 2000.
 Tori Amos covered the song on her album Strange Little Girls, released in 2001
 Johnny Cash covered the song (with Red Hot Chili Peppers) on his 2003 posthumous box set Unearthed
 Kacey Musgraves covered the song on her demo album Kacey Musgraves, released in 2007
 James Taylor covered the song live at Young's award ceremony for MusiCares Person of the Year in 2010
 Superfly covered the song on their 2010 album Wildflower and Cover Songs: Complete Best
 A cover by Charles Bradley was released in 2011 by Daptone Records
Michael Sweet covered the song on his 2014 album I'm Not Your Suicide. An alternate version was released as a video and bonus track featuring Electra Mustaine.
 Passenger covered the song on his covers album Sunday Night Sessions, released in 2017
 Midnight Shine covered the song with elements of their Indigenous language, Mushkegowuk Cree, on the album High Road, released in 2018

Recognition
In 2005, "Heart of Gold" was named the third greatest Canadian song of all time on the CBC Radio One series 50 Tracks: The Canadian Version. It ranked behind only Barenaked Ladies' "If I Had $1,000,000" and Ian and Sylvia's "Four Strong Winds", the latter covered by Young on his 1978 album Comes a Time.

Charts

Certifications

Personnel
 Neil Young — lead vocals, acoustic guitar, harmonica
 Teddy Irwin — guitar
 Ben Keith — pedal steel guitar
 Tim Drummond — bass
 Kenny Buttrey — drums
 James Taylor — backing vocals
 Linda Ronstadt — backing vocals

References

1972 songs
1972 singles
1987 singles
Neil Young songs
Willie Nelson songs
Billboard Hot 100 number-one singles
Cashbox number-one singles
RPM Top Singles number-one singles
Songs written by Neil Young
Reprise Records singles
Song recordings produced by Elliot Mazer
Songs about old age
Song recordings produced by Neil Young
Canadian soft rock songs